The vorticose veins, referred to clinically as the vortex veins, are veins that drain the choroid of the eye. There are usually 4-5 vorticose veins in each eye, with at least one vorticose vein per each quadrant of the eye. Vorticose veins drain into the superior ophthalmic vein, and inferior ophthalmic vein.

Vorticose veins are an important ophthalmoscopic landmark.

Anatomy

Course and relations 
Vorticose veins exit the eyeball 6 mm posterior to its equator.

Fate 
Upper vortex veins empty into the superior ophthalmic vein, and lower vortex veins empty into the inferior ophthalmic vein.

Variation 
The number of vorticose veins is known to vary from 4 to 8, with about 65% of the normal population having 4 or 5 with at least one vein in each quadrant.

Clinical significance 
Vorticose veins are an important ophthalmoscopic landmark. They can be visualised in a dilated pupil using an indirect ophthalmoscope.

Additional images

References

External links

Veins of the head and neck